Imma melanosphena is a moth in the family Immidae. It was described by Edward Meyrick in 1918. It is found in Australia.

References

Moths described in 1918
Immidae
Moths of Australia